Sonia Soto is a translator of Spanish literature into English. She is a past winner (2000) and runner-up (2006) for the Premio Valle-Inclan for Spanish translation.

Books
 The Oxford Murders by Guillermo Martinez
 Winter in Lisbon by Antonio Muñoz Molina
 The Club Dumas by Arturo Perez Reverte
 The Wind from the East by Almudena Grandes
 The Athenian Murders by Jose Carlos Somoza

References

21st-century British translators
20th-century British translators
Year of birth missing (living people)
Living people
20th-century British women writers
21st-century British women writers